William John James (18 October 1921 – 27 July 1980) was a Welsh professional footballer. During his career, he represented Wales at amateur level during wartime competitions and played six times in the Football League for Cardiff City before being forced to retire due to the physical effects of his time spent as a prisoner of war during the Second World War.

Career
Born in Cardiff, James was raised in the Splott area of the city, living in Carlisle Street. He joined his hometown club Cardiff City in 1939 at the start of the Second World War. A prolific scorer for the club during wartime fixtures, he was regarded as an exciting prospect in Welsh football and was chosen to represent Wales in two wartime fixtures against England, scoring in the first match where he played against Stan Cullis. At the age of 18, James enlisted in the army, joining the 77th HAA Regiment, Royal Artillery. The unit contained a number of footballers including other Cardiff City players Ernie Curtis and Billy Baker and embarked on a journey to North Africa by ship for deployment. However, en route, Japanese forces launched attacks on Hong Kong, Singapore and Malaya leading the UK to declare war against Japan which saw James and his unit rerouted to the Dutch colony of Java in the Dutch East Indies where British forces suffered heavy losses and James was one of numerous British troops taken prisoner.

He spent three years in a Japanese prisoner-of-war camp before returning to Britain at the end of the war. He resumed playing for Cardiff City in the 1946–47 season, scoring in his first two matches in the Football League, a 2–1 defeat to Notts County and a 2–0 victory over Bournemouth. However, his time in the POW camp had seen James suffer from severe malnutrition and the effects had resulted in irreparable damage to his eyesight and he was forced into retirement at the end of the season. The club held a benefit game for James in May 1950 and he later returned to work for the club as a scout.

Career statistics

References

1921 births
1980 deaths
Footballers from Cardiff
Welsh footballers
Cardiff City F.C. players
English Football League players
British World War II prisoners of war
Royal Artillery personnel
Cardiff City F.C. non-playing staff
Association football forwards
World War II prisoners of war held by Japan
British Army personnel of World War II
Military personnel from Cardiff